Ropapa Kwamina Mensah (born 20 August 1997) is a Ghanaian footballer who plays for Chattanooga Red Wolves in USL League One.

Club career
Mensah signed with USL Championship side Harrisburg City Islanders on 23 March 2017. For the 2018 season, he moved to another USL team, Nashville SC. On 10 February 2018, he scored the first goal in Nashville SC history, in a friendly against Atlanta United FC.

On November 14, 2018, Nashville announced that they had purchased Mensah from Inter Allies following his season-long loan.

On January 29, 2020, Pittsburgh Riverhounds FC announced that they had signed Mensah to a one year contract for the 2020 season with an option for the 2021 season.

After spending the 2022 season with Egyptian Second Division side Port Fouad FC, Mensah returned to the United States to sign with USL League One side Chattanooga Red Wolves SC on January 27, 2023.

International career
On November 1, 2019, Mensah was called up to Ghana's U23 squad for the 2019 Africa U-23 Cup of Nations.

References

External links

1997 births
Living people
Ghanaian footballers
Penn FC players
Nashville SC (2018–19) players
Pittsburgh Riverhounds SC players
Sporting Kansas City II players
Association football forwards
USL Championship players
International Allies F.C. players
Ghanaian expatriate sportspeople in the United States
Ghana Premier League players
Footballers from Accra
Expatriate soccer players in the United States
Ghanaian expatriate sportspeople in Egypt
Expatriate footballers in Egypt
Ghanaian expatriate footballers
Chattanooga Red Wolves SC players